Lennart Bunke (3 April 1912 – 17 August 1988) was a Swedish football forward who played for Sweden. He also played for Helsingborgs IF.

External links
FIFA profile

1912 births
1988 deaths
Swedish footballers
Sweden international footballers
Association football forwards
Helsingborgs IF players
1938 FIFA World Cup players